Jeniec Europy is a Polish historical film based on the novel by Juliusz Dankowski. It was released in 1989.

Plot 
Year 1815. Napoleon I, after the defeat at Waterloo, is exiled to the Isle of St. Helena. He is accompanied by servants and the most faithful friends. They are assigned the Longwood Estate. A new governor, Hudson Lowe, appears on the island with allied representatives: Count Balmain from Russia, Baron von Sturmer from Austria and the Marquis of Montchenu from France. There are skirmishes between the governor and the prisoner.

Cast
 Roland Blanche : Napoleon Bonaparte
 Vernon Dobtcheff : Hudson Lowe
 François Berléand : General Montholon
 Didier Flamand : General Bertrand
 Ronald Guttman : 	General Gougaud
 Jean-Jacques Moreau : Marchand
 Catriona MacColl : Lady Lowe
 Maria Gładkowska : Madame Montholon
 Isabelle Petit-Jacques : Madame Bertrand
 Georges Claisse : Thomas Reade
 Jay Benedict : Captain Henry Fox
 Jean-François Delacour : Las Cases
 Daniel Langlet : Marquise de Montchenu
 Piotr Krukowski : Sturmer
 Czeslaw Wojtala : Duke Balmain
 Marek Sikora : Santini
 Arkadiusz Bazak : Admiral Cockburn

References

External links
 

1989 films
Polish historical films
1980s Polish-language films
Films directed by Jerzy Kawalerowicz
French multilingual films
1980s historical films
Polish multilingual films
1989 multilingual films